During the American Civil War in the early 1860s, the District of Utah was a subordinate district of the U.S. Army's Department of the Pacific. The district was composed of territorial areas that later became parts of the modern U.S. states of Idaho, Nevada, and Utah.

History 
On August 6, 1862, the Department of the Pacific absorbed the District of Utah, the territory of the former Department of Utah which had been discontinued on July 3, 1861; the remaining troops had marched out August 9.  The District of Utah was composed of the Territory of Nevada and the Territory of Utah.  General Connor established its headquarters at Fort Ruby on August 6, 1862.  After a visit to Salt Lake City he returned and on October 20, moved his headquarters to Camp Douglas, about three miles east of Salt Lake City, Utah where his forces could overlook and intimidate the Mormon leadership who he regarded as traitors to the Union.  On August 20, 1863 the area of Soda Springs, Idaho Territory was added to the district.  His District also provided a garrison for Fort Bridger. The Territory of Nevada became the State of Nevada and was admitted to the Union on October 31, 1864.

Commanders

 Colonel Patrick Edward Connor August 6, 1862 - February 17, 1865 (Department of the Pacific)
 Brigadier General Patrick Edward Connor February 17, 1865 - March 28, 1865 (Department of the Missouri)

On February 17, 1865 the District of Utah was transferred from the Department of the Pacific into the Department of the Missouri.  On March 28, 1865, the district was merged into the Department of the Plains, under Connor's command.  On June 27, 1865, the State of Nevada and Territory of Utah became part of the expanded Department of California that also consisted of the State of California and the Territory of New Mexico and Territory of Arizona.

Posts 
 Mormon Station, Nevada 1849–1910
 Camp Floyd, Utah, 1858–1861; Fort Crittenden, 1861–1862
 Fort Churchill, Nevada 1860–1869
 Camp Schell, Nevada, 1860–1862
 Fort Schellbourne, Nevada, 1862–1869
 Camp Nye, Nevada  1861–1865 
 Camp Douglas, Utah 1862–1878
 Fort Ruby, Nevada 1862–1869
 Camp Smoke Creek, Nevada, 1862–1864
 Camp Cedar Swamps, Utah, 1863
 Camp Connor, Idaho Territory, 1863–1865 
 Camp Dun Glen (1863, 1865-1866)
 Fort Trinity, Nevada, 1863 - 1864 
 Antelope Station, Nevada, 1864  
 Fort Baker, Nevada 1864
 Camp Bingham Creek, Utah, 1864
 Camp Relief, Utah, 1864
 Deep Creek Station, Nevada, 1864 
 Quinn River Camp 1865
 Fort McDermitt, Nevada 1865–1889
 Camp McGarry, Nevada 1865–1868
 Camp McKee, Nevada 1865–1866 
 Camp Overend, Nevada, 1865 
 Salt Lake City Post, Utah, 1865–1866

See also
 California in the American Civil War
 Nevada in the American Civil War
 Utah in the American Civil War

References

Utah
Nevada in the American Civil War
Pacific Coast Theater of the American Civil War
Utah, District of
Utah in the American Civil War
1862 establishments in Utah Territory